The Charmer is a 1925 American silent drama film produced by Famous Players-Lasky and distributed by Paramount. It was directed by Sidney Olcott with Pola Negri in the leading role.

Plot
As described in a film magazine review, a Spanish dancer is brought to the United States after meeting American tourists. Her interest is centered on a wealthy American and his chauffeur. She becomes successful in New York City and the wealthy tourists seek her. She learns that the man is a bounder, but she is involved in a romance with the chauffeur.

Cast

Preservation
With no prints of The Charmer located in any film archives, it is a lost film.

See also
Gertrude Astor filmography

References

External links

 The Charmer website dedicated to Sidney Olcott

Lobby cards: photo#1, photo#2(Wayback)

1925 films
American silent feature films
Films directed by Sidney Olcott
Lost American films
Paramount Pictures films
1925 drama films
Silent American drama films
American black-and-white films
1925 lost films
Lost drama films
1920s American films
1920s English-language films